Josef Altin (born as Yusuf Altın; 12 February 1983) is a British television and film actor who had the role of Pypar in the HBO fantasy TV series Game of Thrones. Other notable performances is his role as Ekrem in Eastern Promises and his roles in The Bill, Peep Show, and Casualty. He starred in D.C. Moore's hit play The Empire at the Royal Court Theatre in London. Altin also played the role of Darren in Him & Her, a BBC TV series.

Life and career
Altin was born in London, to a Turkish family. His first appearance in a television series was his role as Garry in the drama series Psychos. His first appearance on a major British television series came in 2004 when he played a machine strimmer in Blackpool. Over the years, Altin has appeared on The Bill several times in different roles; from 2006 to 2007 he played Jay Henderson, and in 2009 he played Peter Balmaine. After his appearance on The Bill he became a somewhat sought after actor and received many more roles over the coming years, performing in both television series and films multiple times a year.

In 2007, Altin appeared in two films, the first of which being Boy A, where he played Bully, and what is perhaps the biggest budget film he has starred in, Eastern Promises, where he played Ekrem.

He has also appeared in other big television series including Peep Show, Doctors, Robin Hood, Casualty, Little Miss Jocelyn, New Tricks, Being Human, Misfits and Law & Order: UK.

Altin also plays the role of Pypar, commonly called Pyp, in the HBO fantasy TV series Game of Thrones.

2015 saw Altin starring in two films Narcopolis and Child 44. In 2016, Altin starred in the short film, 'I Dream of Zombies'.

On television, in 2017 Altin appeared in the E4 sitcom  Chewing Gum as Ryan, and portrayed Prince Rasselas, a young molly boy who plies his trade on the streets of Covent Garden, in the Hulu Original Harlots. In 2018, Altin played Willem Van Burgen, a disturbed paedophile suffering from syphilis, who comes from a wealthy family, suspected of being the serial killer of boys in the TNT period drama, The Alienist.

Filmography

Music videos
Jamie T – If You Got The Money 2007
Javeon – Give Up 2013

References

External links
 
 Altin on Twitter
 Altin on Myspace

1983 births
Living people
Male actors from London
English male film actors
English male television actors
21st-century English male actors
20th-century English male actors
English people of Turkish descent